Red Bluff was a village located on the Arkansas River in Jefferson County, Arkansas, United States. In 1880, the village had a total population of 74.

Notable people
Moses T. Clegg (1876-1918), a bacteriologist noted for his work in Leprosy

References

External links

Red Bluff Cemetery at ARGenWeb

1869 establishments in Arkansas
1892 disestablishments in Arkansas
Arkansas populated places on the Arkansas River
Former villages in Arkansas
History of Jefferson County, Arkansas
Populated places established in 1869
Populated places disestablished in 1892